Basketbrawl is a sports video game released for the Atari 7800 in 1990, then for the Atari Lynx in 1992. It is a basketball simulation which allows hitting and fighting with other players. The name is a portmanteau of basketball and brawl. It is similar to the 1989 Midway arcade game Arch Rivals which had the tagline "A basket brawl!"

Atari released another sports/fighting combo for the Atari 7800 in 1990 as Ninja Golf. Both were in the final 11 games published by Atari for that system in 1990-91 before dropping support.

Reception
In a 1992 review, Robert Jung gave the Lynx version a 4 out of 10, concluding that "Basketbrawl takes an idea loaded with potential, then removes most of the excitement by combining weak sports action and weak combat action."

In a non-contemporaneous review, Atari 7800 Forever gave Basketbrawl a 4 out of 5: "Although not a pure blooded sports game, Basketbrawl without question is the best sports title for the 7800."

References

1990 video games
Atari 7800 games
Atari Lynx games
Basketball video games
Multiplayer and single-player video games
Video games developed in the United States